Professor Tarantoga (full name: Astral Sternu Tarantoga), an eccentric xenozoologist, traveller, and inventor, is a fictional character from science fiction works, mostly humorous, by Polish writer Stanislaw Lem.

Originally he appeared in The Star Diaries as a friend of the space traveler Ijon Tichy and later appeared in some other works of Lem. Russian literary critic   describes Tarantoga as "a hybrid of mini-Sabaoth  and mini-Frankenstein with good-heardedness of Doctor Aybolit and absent-mindedness of Paganel", who exploited Ijon Tichy to test his crazy ideas: what will happen if the time will be slowed down or will be made into a closed loop, etc.
1963: Wyprawa profesora Tarantogi, scenario, first print: collection Noc księżycowa
1978: Die seltsamen Begenungen des Professor Tarantoga, 99 min., West Germany, director: Chuck Kerremans 
Lem disliked this adaptation, saying that all humor was lost. 
1992: TV play, Poland, first aired September 5, 1992, director Maciej Wojtyszko, Tarantoga:  
 Lem spoke favorably about both the play and the director.  
1963: Czarna komnata profesora Tarantogi, scenario, first print: collection Noc księżycowa
1964: Polish TV film 
1963: Dziwny gość profesora Tarantogi, scenario, first print: collection Noc księżycowa
1971: Polish TV film
1979: Professor Tarantoga und sein seltsamer Gast, TV film, 21 April 1979, East Germany, director Jens-Peter Proll
1975: Godzina przyjęć profesora Tarantogi, radio play 
1977: Professor Tarantogas Sprechstunde (de), radio play by Bayerischer Rundfunk, West Germany, director . It was produced two more times, in 1978 and 1979 by   Österreichischer Rundfunk, Austria
1979: First time printed in collection Powtórka, 1979
The Futurological Congress
Observation on the Spot
Peace on Earth
1986: Azerbaijanfilm Russian-language animated TV film Из дневников Йона Тихого. Путешествие на Интеропию [From the Diaries of Ijon Tichy. A Voyage to Interopia]  based on "The Fourteenth Voyage" 

2011: Ijon Tichy: Raumpilot, TV series season 2, Tarantoga played by Peter Princz

Naum Vilenkin in his 1968 popular math book Рассказы о множествах [Stories About Sets]  invented a story  in which Tarantoga debunks a tall tale of Ijon Tichy using concepts from combinatorics and set theory, such as Venn diagrams and the inclusion–exclusion principle.

The novel Monday Begins on Saturday by Soviet science fiction writers Boris and Arkady Strugatsky mentions "Tarantoga phenomenon" as a synonym for instant teleportation.

References

Characters in written science fiction
Science fiction comedy
Stanisław Lem fictional characters
Fictional inventors
Mad scientists of Stanisław Lem